The 2013–14 UCF Knights women's basketball team represents the University of Central Florida during the 2013–14 NCAA Division I basketball season. The Knights compete in Division I of the National Collegiate Athletic Association (NCAA) and the American Athletic Conference (The American). The Knights, in the program's 37th season of basketball, are led by seventh-year head coach Joi Williams, and play their home games at the CFE Arena on the university's main campus in Orlando, Florida.

The season is UCF's first as a member of The American. UCF played in Conference USA from 2005 to 2013.

Previous season
In the previous year, the Knights finished the season 16–18, 7–9 in Conference USA play.

Roster

Schedule and results

|-
!colspan=9|Non-Conference Regular Season

|-
!colspan=9|American Regular Season

|-
!colspan=12| 2014 American Athletic Conference women's basketball tournament

|-

See also
 2013–14 UCF Knights men's basketball team

References

UCF
UCF Knights women's basketball seasons
UCF Knights
UCF Knights